Anna Morandi Manzolini (21 January 1714 – 9 July 1774) was an internationally known anatomist and anatomical wax modeler, as lecturer of anatomical design at the University of Bologna.

Life 
Morandi was born in 1714 in Bologna, Italy. She was raised in a traditional home where marriage, children, and a domestic lifestyle were natural choices for women. Women were expected to be wives, raise their children and essentially tend to their husbands needs and wants. This wasn’t the case for Anna Morandi. She became a wife and had children, but instead of tending to her husband, she worked side by side with him. In 1736, Morandi married her childhood sweetheart, Giovanni Manzolini, a professor of anatomy at the University of Bologna. She was 20, and he was 24 years old. After five years of marriage, she became the mother of six children. 

Giovanni Manzolini opened a studio in their home for Anna to practice her work. The studio was not only for art but became an anatomy “school” and laboratory for them both. The couple worked together dissecting bodies and learning from them. Between Giovanni’s expertise on human anatomy and Anna’s artistic abilities they were able to recreate such incredible pieces by remodeling human anatomy through sculpture. They taught an abundance of medical students because they had access to many body parts and cadavers. Giovanni and Anna quickly became well known around, not only Bologna but Italy as a whole being that by the early 1750s, the couple had been recognized locally and internationally.

In the year 1755, her husband passed away, leaving both her and her two surviving children without reliable support. As a result, she had to place one child, Guiseppe, in an orphanage. She received tempting job offerings from other universities, but she preferred to remain in her native city, Bologna. After appealing to the pope and passing a strenuous examination by the Bolognese Senate, Manzolini was granted a small annual amount of 300 liras for support. Additionally, she received a post at the University of Bologna as an anatomical demonstrator with access to cadavers from the Bologna hospital. 

Anna Morandi Manzolini impacted the 18th century Bolognese culture through an artistic and scientific approach. She brought human anatomy to life and allowed many spectators to learn and enjoy her anatomical pieces. Tourists, especially medical practitioners, from all over the world came to see her work.  

Morandi died in the city in 1774, at the age of 60.

Career
Knowledge of Morandi's talent in molding anatomical models spread throughout Europe, and she was invited to the court of Catherine II of Russia as well as other royal courts. It became a major turning point in her life. In order to learn anatomy, Morandi had to dissect cadavers, which was extremely difficult for her, but she overcame her fears. Giovanni Manzolini was so encouraged by her and her accomplishments that he again returned to his work. They were recognized as a team by many artists, intellectuals, and anatomists in Europe. When Morandi's husband became ill with tuberculosis, she received special permission to lecture in his place.  After her husband's death in 1755, Morandi was appointed Lecturer in Anatomy in her own name by the Institute of Bologna.

Works
Morandi partnered with her husband, and then surpassed him in skill and reputation after his death in 1755 in the scientific knowledge of human anatomy as well as the accurate demonstration of anatomy in wax sculpture. During her famed household lectures on anatomy given before medical practitioners and grand tourists alike, she imparted expert knowledge of empirical anatomy derived from the dissection of more than 1,000 cadavers by her own account, as well as of anatomical discoveries made both by the couple and Morandi alone. She clearly demonstrated, both theoretically and practically, the wonderful structure of the human body.

Morandi also crafted two portrait busts in wax, both of which are currently on display at the Palazzo Poggi in Bologna. One is a self-portrait, in which she depicts herself at work dissecting a human brain; the other is of her husband, engaged in similar activity. Morandi's wax models were highly prized both while she was alive and long after her death. Some of her anatomical models were so skillfully molded that they were extremely difficult to distinguish from the actual body parts from which they were copied. Furthermore, her acute skill at dissection resulted in her discovery of several previously unknown anatomical parts, including the termination of the oblique muscle of the eye. She held the distinction of having been the first person to reproduce body parts of minute portions in wax, including capillary vessels and nerves.

Supellex Manzoliniana

Morandi's collection of wax models was known throughout Europe as Supellex Manzoliniana, and was eagerly sought after to aid in the study of anatomy. Her work became the archetype of such models as the Vassourie collection and the creations of Dr. Auzoux made from papier mache, which were the forerunners of those used in today's schools and colleges. A collection of her models was acquired by the Medical Institute of Bologna and is housed at the Institute of Science in Bologna.  Her wax self-portrait showing her dissecting a human brain was placed from 1776 in the anatomy museum of the Institute of Sciences in Palazzo Poggi alongside her wax bust of her husband. They were returned to the Poggi in 2000.

Honors
 The title of Professor of Anatomy by the Institute of Bologna, 1756
 The added title of Modelatrice by the Institute of Bologna, 1760
 Honored by numerous heads of state
 Emperor Joseph II of Austria bought one of her models and showed his appreciation of her skill and attainments
 Catherine II of Russia invited her to Moscow to lecture and made her a member of the Russian Royal Scientific Association
 The British Royal Society elected her a member and invited her to lecture in London
 Honored in Italy as the inventor and perfecter of anatomical preparations in wax

Gallery

See also
Timeline of women in science

References

Further reading

External links

 
 University of Bologna biography (in Italian)
 Jeanne Pfeiffer, "The Role of Women in the Development of Modern Anatomy", 2007–2009 (covering Marie Marguerite Bihéron and Anna Morandi Manzolini)

1714 births
1774 deaths
Italian educators
18th-century Italian sculptors
18th-century Italian women artists
18th-century Italian women scientists
18th-century Italian scientists
Academic staff of the University of Bologna
Italian anatomists
Italian women scientists
Women anatomists